Mt Maria College Petrie is a Catholic co-educational secondary college located in Petrie, a suburb in Queensland, Australia. It opened in 1987, and by 2019 had an enrolment of about 420. It offers both work and university preparatory education.

References  

Marist Brothers schools
Educational institutions established in 1987
1987 establishments in Australia
Catholic secondary schools in Brisbane
Petrie, Queensland
Buildings and structures in Moreton Bay Region